The 1958 San Jose State Spartans football team represented San Jose State College during the 1958 NCAA University Division football season.

San Jose State played as an Independent in 1958. The team was led by second-year head coach Bob Titchenal, and played home games at Spartan Stadium in San Jose, California. The Spartans finished the 1958 season with a record of four wins and five losses (4–5). Overall, the team outscored its opponents 174–106 for the season.

Schedule

Team players in the NFL
The following San Jose State players were selected in the 1959 NFL Draft.

Notes

References

San Jose State
San Jose State Spartans football seasons
San Jose State Spartans football